Perkins Local School District is a public school district serving students in Perkins Township near the city of Sandusky in Erie County, Ohio, United States. The school district enrolls 2,370 students as of the 2007–2008 academic year.

Schools

Elementary schools
Furry Elementary School (Grades K through 2nd)
Meadowlawn Elementary School (Grades 3rd through 5th)

Middle schools
Perkins (Briar) Middle School (Grades 6th through 8th)

High schools
Perkins High School (Grades 9th through 12th)

References

External links
Perkins Local School District website

School districts in Ohio
Education in Erie County, Ohio